Atghar District is a district of Zabul province in southern Afghanistan.

Demographics 
The population in 2005 was estimated 8,400 in 2013. The district is mostly populated by the Hotak tribe of Ghilji Pashtuns.

History 
The district's military base was evacuated on December 22, 2020, indicating an incoming the Taliban presence there

See also 
 Districts of Afghanistan

References

External links 

Districts of Zabul Province